The 1923-24 French Rugby Union Championship was won for the second consecutive year by Toulouse that defeated the US Perpignan in the final.

The Championship was contested by thirty teams divided in the first round in 6 pool of 5.

First round
(in bold the qualified for second round)

 Pool A 
SO Avignon
Béziers
US Cognac
Hendaye
Toulouse 
 Pool B 
Bayonne
 Chalon, 
Grenoble
Narbonne
Périgueux
 Pool C 
 Albi 
 Lézignan
 Pau
 Poitiers
 Racing
 Pool D 
 AS Bayonne
 SBUC
 Carcassonne
 Lourdes
 Olympique Paris
 Pool E 
 Begles
 US Perpignan
 Soustons
 Touloun, 
 Toulouse OEC
 Pool F 
 Agen
 Biarritz 
 SA Bordeaux
 Stade Français
 Stadoceste

Quarter of finals 
(in bold the qualified for semifinals round)

 Second Round 
 Lourdes
 Narbonne
Toulouse
 Pool B 
 Albi
 Bayonne
 US Perpignan
 Pool C 
 Bègles
 Béziers
 Biarritz
 Pool D 
 Carcassonne
 Racing 
 Stadoceste

Semifinals

Final

Other competitions

 In the final of  Second Division, the SC Mazamétain beat  SC Graulhet 3 - 0.
 In the final of third Division, the NAC Champ-sur-Drac beat FCCarmaux 8 - 3.
 In the final of  Fourth Division, SC Negrepelisse beat Stade Minervois 8 - 3.
 In the final of 2nd XV championship, Bayonne beat Toulouse 14-5

Sources 
 L'Humanité, 1924
 Compte rendu de la finale de 1924, sur lnr.fr
 finalesrugby.com

1924
France
Championship